Timmy Towers is a children's television series produced by Brilliant TV that was first shown in 1997. The programme starred Timmy Mallett as himself, Mark Speight as the Abominable No Man, Alex Lovell as Miss Thing and Roger Bremble as Aunty Knobbly Knees.

A pilot episode was broadcast in 1997 and the programme was picked up for a full series of 7 episodes in 2000.

References

External links

1997 British television series debuts
2000 British television series endings
ITV children's television shows
British children's game shows